Popular tourist attractions in Taiwan include the following:

Attractions

Historical buildings
 Beihai Tunnel, Beigan
 Beihai Tunnel, Nangan
 Daxi Wude Hall
 Eternal Golden Castle
 First Guesthouse
 Fongyi Tutorial Academy
 Former British Consulate at Takao
 Former Japanese Navy Fongshan Communication Center
 Former Tainan Weather Observatory
 Fort Provintia
 Fort Santo Domingo
 Fort Zeelandia
 Fuxing Barn
 Great South Gate
 Gulongtou Zhenwei Residence
 Hobe Fort
 Jhen Wen Academy
 Kaohsiung Grand Hotel
 Keelung Fort Commander's Official Residence
 Lee Teng-fan's Ancient Residence
 Lin Family Mansion and Garden
 Meinong East Gate Tower
 Moving Castle
 Niumatou Site
 North Gate of Xiong Town
 Presidential Office Building
 Qihou Fort
 Qing Dynasty Taiwan Provincial Administration Hall
 Shihlin Paper Mill
 Taipei Guest House
 Tianma Tea House
 Walls of Taipei
 Wistaria Tea House
 Workshop of Advanced Academy of Agronomy and Forestry
 Wude Martial Arts Center
 Wufeng Lin Family Mansion and Garden
 Yuanshan Grand Hotel
 Yunlin Story House
 Zhongshan Hall

Memorials
 228 Peace Memorial Park
 Black Bat Squadron Memorial Hall
 Chen Dexing Ancestral Hall
 Chen Jhong-he Memorial Hall
 Chiang Kai-shek Memorial Hall
 Chin Pao San
 Cihu Mausoleum
 Drop of Water Memorial Hall
 Eternal Spring Shrine
 Gaoshi Shrine
 Green Island Human Rights Culture Park
 Guo Ziyi Memorial Hall
 Jiji Military History Park
 Jing-Mei White Terror Memorial Park
 Kagi Shrine
 Kaohsiung Martyrs' Shrine
 Koxinga Ancestral Shrine
 Liu Clan Shrine
 National Revolutionary Martyrs' Shrine
 Ōgon Shrine
 Shetou Doushan Ancestral Shrine
 Shigong Shrine
 Sun Yat-sen Memorial Hall
 Taichung Martyrs' Shrine
 Taoyuan Martyrs' Shrine
 Tomb of Chen Jhong-he
 Touliao Mausoleum
 Wang Yun-wu Memorial Hall
 Wukou Village Liou Family Ancestral Hall
 Xiaolin Village Memorial Park
 Yang Family Ancestral Hall
 Zhong-Sheng-Gong Memorial

Skyscrapers

 Shin Kong Life Tower
 Sun-Shooting Tower
 Taipei 101
 Tuntex Sky Tower

Public places, squares and art centers
 Chiayi Performing Arts Center
 Chung Hsing Cultural and Creative Park
 Dadong Arts Center
 Hongmaogang Cultural Park
 Hsinchu City Art Site of Railway Warehouse
 Huashan 1914 Creative Park
 Liberty Square
 Li Mei-shu Memorial Gallery
 Lukang Artist Village
 National Center for Traditional Arts
 National Changhua Living Art Center
 National Hsinchu Living Arts Center
 Pier-2 Art Center
 Songshan Cultural and Creative Park
 Taichung City Tun District Art Center
 Taichung Cultural and Creative Industries Park
 Tainan Cultural and Creative Park
 Taipei Expo Park
 Taoyuan Arts Center
 Xikou Township Cultural Life Center
 Yuanlin Performance Hall
 Zhecheng Cultural Park
 Zhongli Arts Hall

Lighthouses

Temples 

 Changfu Temple
 Chaotian Temple
 Chung Tai Chan Monastery
 Dharma Drum Mountain
 Fo Guang Shan Monastery
 Great Queen of Heaven Temple
 Guandu Temple
 Linji Huguo Chan Temple
 Nung Chan Monastery
 Shandao Temple
 State Temple of the Martial God
 Xingtian Temple

Pagodas 
 Ci En Pagoda
 Dragon and Tiger Pagodas
 Maoshan Pagoda
 Spring and Autumn Pavilions
 Wentai Pagoda

Churches
 High-Heel Wedding Church
 Holy Rosary Cathedral
 Luce Memorial Chapel

Mosques

 An-Nur Tongkang Mosque
 At-Taqwa Mosque
 Kaohsiung Mosque
 Longgang Mosque
 Taichung Mosque
 Tainan Mosque
 Taipei Cultural Mosque
 Taipei Grand Mosque

Museums

 228 Memorial Museum
 921 Earthquake Museum of Taiwan
 Arwin Charisma Museum Tourist Factory
 Assembly Affairs Museum of the Legislative Yuan
 August 23 Artillery Battle Museum
 Beitou Hot Spring Museum
 Beitou Museum
 Beitou Plum Garden
 Beneficial Microbes Museum and Tourism Factory
 Bo Yang Museum
 BRAND'S Health Museum
 Bunun Cultural Museum
 Changhua Arts Museum
 Chelungpu Fault Preservation Park
 Chengkungling History Museum
 Chi Mei Museum
 Chiayi Municipal Museum
 Chihsing Tan Katsuo Museum
 Chinese Furniture Museum
 Chung Li-he Museum
 Chunghwa Postal Museum
 Cijin Shell Museum
 Coca-Cola Museum
 Coral Museum
 Culture Museum of Sikou Township Office
 Evergreen Maritime Museum
 Fangyuan Museum of Arts
 Fire Safety Museum of Taipei City Fire Department
 Fo Guang Shan Buddha Museum
 Former Residence of Zhang Xueliang
 Formosa Plastics Group Museum
 Furniture Manufacturing Eco-Museum in Tainan
 Glass Museum of Hsinchu City
 Gold Museum
 Guningtou War Museum
 Honey Museum
 Hsinchu City Fire Museum
 Hualien County Stone Sculptural Museum
 Huoyan Mountain Ecology Museum
 Image Museum of Hsinchu City
 Jiasian Petrified Fossil Museum
 Ju Ming Museum
 Kaohsiung Astronomical Museum
 Kaohsiung Hakka Cultural Museum
 Kaohsiung Harbor Museum
 Kaohsiung Museum of Fine Arts
 Kaohsiung Museum of History
 Kaohsiung Museum of Labor
 Kuo Yuan Ye Museum of Cake and Pastry
 Lanyang Museum
 Li Tien-lu Hand Puppet Historical Museum
 Liu Hsing-chin Comic Museum
 Lukang Folk Arts Museum
 Mei-hwa Spinning Top Museum
 Meinong Hakka Culture Museum
 Miaoli Pottery Museum
 Miaoli Railway Museum
 Miniatures Museum of Taiwan
 Muh Sheng Museum of Entomology
 Museum of Anthropology
 Museum of Archives
 Museum of Contemporary Arts Taipei
 Museum of Drinking Water
 Museum of Medical Humanities
 Museum of Saisiat Folklore
 Museum of World Religions
 Museum of Zoology
 National Cheng Kung University Museum
 National Museum of History
 National Museum of Marine Biology and Aquarium
 National Museum of Natural Science
 National Museum of Prehistory
 National Museum of Taiwan History
 National Museum of Taiwan Literature
 National Palace Museum
 National Radio Museum
 National Science and Technology Museum
 National Taiwan Museum
 National Taiwan Museum of Fine Arts
 New Taipei City Hakka Museum
 New Taipei City Yingge Ceramics Museum
 Penghu Living Museum
 Ping Huang Coffee Museum
 Ping-Lin Tea Museum
 Pingtung Art Museum
 Republic of China Air Force Museum
 Republic of China Armed Forces Museum
 Republic of China Presidential Museum
 Rueylong Museum
 Sanyi Wood Sculpture Museum
 Shihsanhang Museum of Archaeology
 Shilin Official Residence
 Shung Ye Museum of Formosan Aborigines
 Soy Sauce Brewing Museum
 Soya-Mixed Meat Museum
 Spring Onion Culture Museum
 Suho Memorial Paper Museum
 Taichung English and Art Museum
 Taipei Astronomical Museum
 Taipei City Museum
 Taipei Fine Arts Museum
 Taipei Story House
 Taitung Art Museum
 Taiwan Balloons Museum
 Taiwan Coal Mine Museum
 Taiwan Design Museum
 Taiwan Hinoki Museum
 Taiwan Land Reform Museum
 Taiwan Metal Creative Museum
 Taiwan Mochi Museum
 Taiwan Nougat Museum
 Taiwan Salt Museum
 Taiwan Sugar Museum (Kaohsiung)
 Taiwan Sugar Museum (Tainan)
 Taiwan Theater Museum
 Taiwan Times Village
 Takao Railway Museum
 Tamkang University Maritime Museum
 Teng Feng Fish Ball Museum
 Tittot Glass Art Museum
 World Police Museum
 Wulai Atayal Museum
 Wulai Tram Museum
 Yilan Distillery Chia Chi Lan Wine Museum
 YM Museum of Marine Exploration Kaohsiung
 YM Oceanic Culture and Art Museum
 Yu Da Wei Xian Sheng Memorial Museum
 Yunlin Hand Puppet Museum
 Zaochiao Charcoal Museum

Tourist towns
 Anping, Tainan City
 Caoling, Yunlin County
 Dajia, Taichung City
 Daxi, Taoyuan City
 Houtong Cat Village, New Taipei City
 Jiaoxi, Yilan County
 Jinguashi, New Taipei City
 Jiji, Nantou County
 Jincheng Township, Kinmen County
 Jiufen, New Taipei City
 Lukang, Changhua County
 Meinong, Kaohsiung City
 Tamsui, New Taipei City

Night markets

 Caotun Night Market
 Fengjia Night Market
 Jin-Zuan Night Market
 Kaisyuan Night Market
 Lehua Night Market
 Liuhe Night Market
 Luodong Night Market
 Nanya Night Market
 Raohe Street Night Market
 Ruifeng Night Market
 Shilin Night Market
 Snake Alley
 Tainan Flower Night Market
 Wenhua Road Night Market
 Zhonghua Street Night Market

Streets
 Central Street
 Danshui Old Street
 Daxi Old Street
 Dihua Street
 Mofan Street
 Sanfong Central Street
 Toucheng Old Street
 Yizhong Street

Natural scenery and forest

 Alishan National Scenic Area
 Bitan
 Cape Eluanbi
 Cape San Diego
 Dakeng
 Double-Heart of Stacked Stones
 Gaomei Wetlands
 Jhihben National Forest Recreation Area
 Little Taiwan
 Maokong
 Penghu National Scenic Area
 Sansiantai
 Sihcao Wetlands
 Siraya National Scenic Area
 Taiwan Southernmost Point
 Whale Cave
 Yehliu Geopark

Lakes and reservoirs
 Changpi Lake
 Chengcing Lake
 Cueifong Lake
 Gugang Lake
 Lantan Lake
 Liyu Lake
 Longtan Lake
 Lotus Pond
 Meihua Lake
 Milk Lake
 Sun Moon Lake
 Wusanto Reservoir
 Zhongzheng Lake

Mountains and cliffs

 Chingshui Cliff
 Luye Highlands
 Mount Banping
 Mount Dabajian
 Mount Guanyin
 Mount Hehuan
 Mount Pingfeng
 Mount Qixing
 Mount Shou
 Mount Yangming
 Mount Yu

National parks

 Kenting National Park
 Shei-Pa National Park
 Southwest Coast National Scenic Area
 Taijiang National Park
 Taroko National Park
 Yangmingshan National Park
 Yushan National Park

City parks and gardens

 Beinan Cultural Park
 Bihu Park
 Changhua Fitzroy Gardens
 Chengmei Riverside Park
 Chiayi Park
 Cijin Wind Turbine Park
 Daan Forest Park
 Dahu Park
 Dajia Riverside Park
 Dapingding Tropical Botanical Garden
 Dongshan River Water Park
 Erlun Sports Park
 Guanshan Riverside Park
 Guanshan Waterfront Park
 Ho Ping Island Hi Park
 Kaohsiung Metropolitan Park
 Kaohsiung Park
 Meiti Riverside Park
 Nanhu Riverside Park
 Nanxing Park
 Rongxing Garden Park
 Sanmin Park
 Shaochuantou Park
 Shuangxi Park and Chinese Garden
 Taichung Park
 Taipei Botanical Garden
 Taitung Forest Park
 Water Tower Park
 Weiwuying Metropolitan Park
 Wu Feng Park
 Wulaokeng Scenic Area
 Xinzhong Park
 Yingfeng Riverside Park

Rivers

 Fengshan River
 Keelung River
 Love River
 Tamsui River
 Xiuguluan River

Waterfalls
 Jiao Lung Waterfall
 Shifen Waterfall
 Wulai Waterfall

Beaches
 Baisha Bay
 Qixingtan Beach
 Fulong Beach
 Neipi Beach
 South Bay
 Yanliao Beach Park

Harbors, wharf and piers

 Badouzi Fish Harbor
 Fugang Fishery Harbor
 Haishan Fishing Port
 Kaohsiung Fisherman's Wharf
 Love Pier
 Shen-ao Fishing Harbor
 Tamsui Fisherman's Wharf
 Wanggong Fishing Port
 Wuci Fishery Harbor
 Zhuwei Fish Harbor

Hot and cold springs

 Beitou Hot Spring
 Guanziling Hot Spring
 Jhiben Hot Spring
 Jiaoxi Hot Spring
 Su-ao Cold Spring
 Tai-an Hot Spring

Islands and islets
 Green Island
 Jiangong Islet
 Kinmen Islands
 Lalu Island
 Lamay Island
 Matsu Islands
 Orchid Island
 Penghu Islands

Leisure resorts
 Atayal Resort
 Bunun Tribal Leisure Farm
 Flying Cow Ranch
 Green World Ecological Farm
 Jianshanpi Jiangnan Resort
 Kentington Resort
 Ming Shan Resort
 Qingjing Farm
 Shangri-La Leisure Farm
 Toucheng Leisure Farm
 Yun Hsien Resort

Cultural centers
 Amis Folk Center
 Dongshih Hakka Cultural Park
 Hakka Round House
 Hongmaogang Cultural Park
 Kaohsiung Cultural Center
 Keelung Cultural Center
 Ketagalan Culture Center
 Mongolian and Tibetan Cultural Center
 Taichung City Dadun Cultural Center
 Tainan Municipal Cultural Center
 Taipei Cultural Center
 Taipei Hakka Culture Hall
 Taoyuan Hakka Culture Hall
 Wu Zhuo-liu Art and Cultural Hall
 Xinying Cultural Center

Theme parks
 Bada Forest Theme Paradise
 Dalukung Land
 E-DA Theme Park
 Fantasy World
 Formosa Fun Coast
 Formosan Aboriginal Culture Village
 Hou Yen Shan Hot Spring Area
 Hsinchu Maple in the Spring Corp
 Janfusun Fancyworld
 Landmine Theme Park
 Leofoo Village Theme Park
 Lihpao Land
 Little Ding-Dong Science Theme Park
 Shan Gri La Paradise
 Sun-Link-Sea Forest and Nature Resort
 Taipei Children's Amusement Park
 Taipei Water Park
 Taiwan Studio City
 Taroko Park
 Wan Ruey Forest Paradise
 West Lake Resortopia
 Window on China Theme Park
 Yamay

Zoos
 Farglory Ocean Park
 Fonghuanggu Bird and Ecology Park
 Hsinchu Zoo
 Shou Shan Zoo
 Taipei Zoo
 Wanpi World Safari Zoo
 Yehliu Ocean World

Shopping districts
 Urban Spotlight Arcade
 Ximending

Shopping centers

 Breeze Center
 Dream Mall
 Guang Hua Digital Plaza
 Hayashi Department Store
 Miramar Entertainment Park
 Taipei 101 Mall
 Taipei Fish Market
 Taipei Underground Market
 Zhongshan Metro Mall

Educational centers
 Discovery Center of Taipei
 National Taiwan Arts Education Center
 National Taiwan Science Education Center
 Taipower Exhibit Center in Southern Taiwan

Libraries
 Changhua City Library
 National Central Library
 National Library of Public Information
 National Taiwan Library
 Taipei Public Library Beitou Branch

Halls and theaters
 Guling Street Avant-garde Theatre
 International Convention Center Kaohsiung
 Kaohsiung City Music Hall
 Kaohsiung Exhibition Center
 Kaohsiung Film Archive
 National Theater and Concert Hall
 New Taipei City Exhibition Hall
 Red House Theater
 Taipei Film House
 Taipei International Convention Center
 Taipei World Trade Center
 Taipei World Trade Center Nangang Exhibition Hall
 Wellspring Theater
 World Trade Center Taichung
 Xiluo Theater

Stadiums

 Chung Cheng Martial Arts Stadium
 Fengshan Stadium
 Kaohsiung Arena
 Kaohsiung National Stadium
 Taipei Arena
 Taipei Dome
 Taipei Municipal Stadium
 Taiwan Provincial Stadium
 Taoyuan Arena
 Yunlin Indoor Arena

Transportations
 Bisha Fishing Port
 New Taipei Bridge
 Qishan Train Station
 Shengxing Station
 Singuang Ferry Wharf
 Wulai Scenic Train
 Xiluo Bridge

Attractions by region
 List of tourist attractions in Taipei

Former attractions
 Children's Museum of Taipei
 Chinese Culture and Movie Center
 Chung Cheng Aviation Museum
 Sanzhi UFO houses

Festivals
 Baishatun Mazu Pilgrimage
 Beigang International Music Festival
 Formoz Festival
 Hohaiyan Rock Festival
 Qing Shan King Sacrificial Ceremony
 Taipei Film Festival
 Taiwan Lantern Festival
 Women Make Waves
 Yilan International Children's Folklore and Folkgame Festival

See also 
 Taiwan
 National parks of Taiwan

References

External links 

Bureau of Cultural Heritage, List of Potential Heritage Sites in Taiwan
Tourism Bureau, Ministry of Transportation and Communications, Republic of China (English)
Tourism Bureau,  Ministry of Transportation and Communications, Republic of China (Mandarin)
Travel Section, Taipei Economic and Cultural Office, Sydney
Taiwan Tour Bus 台灣觀光巴士

Taiwan, tourist attractions